The Challenge may refer to:

Film
 The Challenge, a 1916 silent film starring Montagu Love
 The Challenge (1922 film), an American silent film directed by Tom Terriss
 The Challenge (1938 film), a mountain-climbing story starring Robert Douglas
 The Challenge (1948 film), an American film starring Tom Conway
 The Challenge (1958 film), an Italian film by Francesco Rosi, starring José Suárez 
 The Challenge (1960 film), a British crime film featuring Jayne Mansfield and Anthony Quayle
 The Challenge (1970 film), starring Darren McGavin
 The Challenge... A Tribute to Modern Art, a 1974 documentary film
 The Challenge (1982 film), an action movie starring Scott Glenn and Toshirō Mifune
 The Challenge (2003 film), featuring the Olsen twins
 The Challenge (2011 film), based on the book by Jonathan Mahler
 The Challenge (2022 film), a Russian space docudrama

Television
 "The Challenge" (Yes Minister), a 1982 episode of the British comedy series Yes Minister
 "The Challenge" (Recess episode), a 1998 episode of the Disney animated series Recess
 The Challenge (TV series), a reality game show on MTV, originally titled Real World/Road Rules Challenge
The Challenge: All Stars, a spinoff of the main Challenge series featuring cast members from previous seasons
The Challenge: USA, a 2022 spinoff series featuring former CBS reality contestants
The Challenge: Australia, a 2022 spinoff series featuring former Australian reality contestants and celebrities
 The Challenge (miniseries), a 1986 Australian mini series based on the 1983 America's Cup

Other
 The Challenge (album), a 1968 Hampton Hawes recording
 The Challenge (novel), a 1937 novel featuring the character Bulldog Drummond
 The Challenge (game show), a high school game show available to Cablevision customers
 The examination sat by entrants to Westminster School who are applying for a Queen's Scholarship

See also
 Challenge (disambiguation)
 Challenger (disambiguation)